Choctaw Corner was a former town in Clarke County, Alabama, United States.  It is named for the nearby Choctaw Corner, which marked the border between the native Choctaw and Creek peoples prior to the Indian removal.  The community was one of the earliest settlements in the county.

Choctaw Corner had a post office by 1850. It was a prosperous community during the antebellum period and for many years afterwards.

A new town, Thomasville, developed on the railroad. The people in the older community saw the potential of the new town as a railroad shipping point and were among the first people to move there.  The former town of Choctaw Corner slowly declined into nonexistence and was later enveloped within Thomasville's city limits.  It is now remembered primarily by Thomasville's city cemetery on its western border, called Choctaw Corner Cemetery.

Geography

References

Geography of Clarke County, Alabama
Ghost towns in Alabama
Ghost towns in the United States
Ghost towns in North America
Alabama placenames of Native American origin